, also known as KKB, is a television network headquartered in Kagoshima Prefecture, Japan. It is affiliated with ANN. 

Kagoshima Broadcasting is the third commercial television station in Kagoshima prefecture. Minaminihon Broadcasting, the first commercial broadcaster in Kagoshima prefecture, is one of the main shareholders of Kagoshima Broadcasting. On July 1, 2006, KKB started digital terrestrial television broadcasting.

References

External links
  Official website 

All-Nippon News Network
Companies based in Kagoshima Prefecture
Television stations in Japan
Television channels and stations established in 1982
1982 establishments in Japan